Davide Lodesani (born 4 May 1995) is an Italian football player.

Club career
In July 2015, he signed for Foggia. He made his Serie C debut for Foggia on 30 April 2016 in a game against Martina Franca.

References

External links
 

1995 births
Sportspeople from the Province of Modena
Living people
Italian footballers
U.S. Sassuolo Calcio players
Calcio Foggia 1920 players
A.S. Melfi players
Serie B players
Serie C players
Serie D players
Association football forwards
Footballers from Emilia-Romagna